Bo-kyung is a Korean unisex given name. Its meaning differs based on the hanja used to write each syllable of the name. There are 18 hanja with the reading "bo" and 54 hanja with the reading "kyung" on the South Korean government's official list of hanja which may be registered for use in given names.

People with this name include:
Kim Bo-kyong, one of the rebel leaders from Cheonan executed during the Donghak Peasant Revolution 
Yi Kwang-su (courtesy name Bogyeong, 1892–1950), Korean writer and independence activist
Ha Po-gyong (1906–1996), South Korean dancer
Ok So-ri (born Ok Bo-gyeong, 1968), South Korean actress
Kim Bo-kyung (actress) (born 1976), South Korean actress
Stephanie (South Korean singer) (born Kim Bo-kyung, 1987), South Korean female singer, member of The Grace
Choi Bo-kyung (born 1988), South Korean male footballer
Kim Bo-kyung (born 1989), South Korean male footballer
Lydia Ko (Korean name Ko Bo-kyung, born 1997), South Korean-born New Zealand female golfer

Fictional characters with this name include:
Yoon Bo-kyung, female character in 2012 South Korean television series Moon Embracing the Sun

See also
List of Korean given names

References

Korean unisex given names